Ronald Fields (born September 13, 1981) is a former American football nose tackle. He was drafted by the San Francisco 49ers in the fifth round of the 2005 NFL Draft. He played college football at Mississippi State.

He has also been a member of the Denver Broncos, Miami Dolphins, and Carolina Panthers.

College career
Ronald Fields attended Mississippi State University, where he played nose guard, won first-team All-SEC accolades, and finished his career with one sack, 172 tackles (16.5 for losses), six quarterback hurries, one forced fumble, and two fumble recoveries. He majored in teaching and coaching.

Professional career

San Francisco 49ers
Fields was selected by the San Francisco 49ers in the fifth round (137th overall) in the 2005 NFL Draft. In his rookie season he played in four games recording seven tackles. He made his NFL debut versus the Seattle Seahawks on November 20. In 2006, he played in 13 games and finished the campaign with a career high 28 tackles. He also started his first game versus the San Diego Chargers. In 2007, he recorded 21 tackles as well as his first career sack against the Arizona Cardinals.

Denver Broncos
On March 2, 2009, Fields signed a two-year contract with the Denver Broncos.  He was their starting nose tackle for the year 2009. However, he was succeeded by another player the following year.

Miami Dolphins
Fields signed with the Miami Dolphins on July 31, 2011, but was released on September 3.

Carolina Panthers
Fields signed with the Carolina Panthers on September 13, 2011. He was waived on November 8.

Personal life
Fields is a cousin of defensive tackle Kenderick Allen.

References

External links
San Francisco 49ers bio

1981 births
Living people
People from Bogalusa, Louisiana
Players of American football from Louisiana
American football defensive tackles
Mississippi State Bulldogs football players
San Francisco 49ers players
Denver Broncos players
Miami Dolphins players
Carolina Panthers players